The discography of Mila J, an American R&B singer, consists of one studio album, five mixtapes, sixteen extended plays (EP), sixteen singles and eighteen music videos.

Albums

Studio albums

Collaborative albums

Mixtapes

Miscellaneous

Extended plays

Singles

As lead artist

As featured artist

Guest appearances

Videography

Music videos

Notes

References 

Rhythm and blues discographies
Hip hop discographies
Discographies of American artists